10BASE5 (also known as thick Ethernet or thicknet) was the first commercially available variant of Ethernet. Up to 100 stations can be connected to the cable using vampire taps and share a single collision domain with 10 Mbit/s of bandwidth shared among them. The system is difficult to install and maintain.

10BASE5 was superseded by much cheaper and more convenient alternatives: first by 10BASE2 based on a thinner coaxial cable, and then, once Ethernet over twisted pair was developed, by 10BASE-T and its successors 100BASE-TX and 1000BASE-T. In 2003, the IEEE 802.3 working group deprecated 10BASE5 for new installations.

Name origination
The name 10BASE5 is derived from several characteristics of the physical medium. The 10 refers to its transmission speed of 10 Mbit/s.

Network design and installation
For its physical layer 10BASE5 uses cable similar to RG-8/U coaxial cable but with extra braided shielding. This is a stiff,  diameter cable with an impedance of 50 ohms, a solid center conductor, a foam insulating filler, a shielding braid, and an outer jacket. Up to 100 nodes could be connected to a 10BASE5 segment.

Transceiver nodes can be connected to cable segments with N connectors, or via a vampire tap, which allows new nodes to be added while existing connections are live. A vampire tap clamps onto the cable, a hole is drilled through the outer shielding, and a spike is forced to pierce the outer three layers and contact the inner conductor while other spikes bite into the outer braided shield. Care is required to keep the outer shield from touching the spike; installation kits include a "coring tool" to drill through the outer layers and a "braid pick" to clear stray pieces of the outer shield.

Transceivers should be installed only at precise 2.5-meter intervals. This distance was chosen to not correspond to the signal's wavelength; this ensures that the reflections from multiple taps are not in phase. These suitable points are marked on the cable with black bands. The cable is required to be one continuous run; T-connections are not allowed.

As is the case with most other high-speed buses, segments must be terminated at each end. For coaxial-cable-based Ethernet, each end of the cable has a 50 ohm resistor attached. Typically this resistor is built into a male N connector and attached to the cable's end just past the last device. With termination missing, or if there is a break in the cable, the signal on the bus will be reflected, rather than dissipated when it reaches the end. This reflected signal is indistinguishable from a collision and prevents communication.

Disadvantages
Adding new stations to the network is complicated by the need to pierce the cable accurately. The cable is stiff and difficult to bend around corners. One improper connection can take down the whole network and finding the source of the trouble is difficult.

See also

 Classic Ethernet
 EAD-socket

Notes

References

Ethernet standards